Bailey is a given name derived from the surname Bailey.
The most likely derivation of the surname is from bailli, the Anglo-Norman equivalent of bailiff.

Use of surnames as masculine given names is mostly an American fashion of the 19th century. An early American bearer of the given name was Bailey Bartlett (1750–1830). 
Occasional use of Bailey as given name in the USA is recorded throughout the 19th century, but it mostly fell out of use by the 1940s. 
In the 1980s, it saw a resurgence of popularity as a feminine name beginning in the 1980s,  popularized by the female character Bailey Quarters in the American comedy television sitcom WKRP in Cincinnati (1978-1982), played by Jan Smithers. 
In the 1990s to 2000s, there was also a resurgence in use as a masculine name. 

Following the US fashion, the name came to be used in other English-speaking countries beginning in the 1990s.
In England, it ranked among the top 200 masculine names  in the 1990s. Bailey was the 70th most popular name for boys born in England and Wales and Ireland in 2007 and was the 91st most popular name for boys born in Scotland in 2006. Spelling variations of the name are also in wide use.

Notable people with the given name

Masculine
Bailey Akehurst (born 2003), English professional footballer
Bailey Aldrich (1907-2002), American judge and lawyer
Bailey Ashford (1873-1934), American physician and army soldier
Bailey Banfield (born 1998), Australian professional rules footballer
Bailey Bartlett (1750-1830), American politician
Bailey Barton Burritt (1878-1954), American public health- and social welfare advocate and physician
Bailey Biondi-Odo (born 2001), Australian professional rugby league footballer
Bailey Brown (1917-2004), American judge and navy officer
Bailey Capel (born 2000), Australian cricketer
Bailey Chase (born 1972), American stage and television actor
Bailey Clements (born 2000), English footballer
Bailey Dale (born 1996), Australian rules footballer
Bailey Davies (1884-1968), Welsh rugby union fullback
Bailey Falter (born 1997), American baseball player
Bailey Farquharson, Australian murder victim
Bailey Feltmate (born 1998), Canadian professional football player
Bailey Gaither (born 1997), American football player
Bailey Gatzert (1829-1893), American politician
Bailey Hardeman (1795-1836), American first Secretary of the Treasury for the Republic of Texas
Bailey Hayward (born 1996), Scottish international rugby league footballer
Bailey Hodgson (born 2002), English professional rugby league footballer
Bailey Howell (born 1937), American former NBA player
Bailey Jacobson, American orthodontist
Bailey Johnson, several people
Bailey Junior Kurariki (born 1989), New Zealand criminal
Bailey May (born 2002), Filipino-British actor, model, singer, dancer, and television personality
Bailey Ober (born 1995), American MLB pitcher
Bailey Olter (1932-1999), Micronesian politician
Bailey Patrick, English television- and film actor
Bailey Peacock-Farrell (born 1996), English footballer
Bailey Rice (born 1997), Australian-born American college football punter and former Australian rules footballer
Bailey Rowe (born 2002), British Virgin Islands footballer
Bailey Santistevan (1901-1954), American baseball coach
Bailey Simonsson (born 1998), New Zealand Maori international rugby league footballer
Bailey Smith (born 2000), Australian rules footballer
Bailey Sugden (born 1997), British kickboxer
Bailey T. Barco (1846-1901), American coast guard captain
Bailey W. Diffie (1902-1983), American historian and teacher
Bailey Walsh (1905-1962), American politician
Bailey Washington (1731-1807), American planter and legislator
Bailey Washington Jr. (1753-1814), American planter and legislator
Bailey Wightman (born 1999), English-born Australian cricketer
Bailey Williams, several people
Bailey Willis (1857-1949), American geological engineer
Bailey Wright (born 1992), Australian footballer
Bailey Zappe (born 1999), American football player
Bailey Zimmerman, American country music artist

Feminine
Bailey Aarons (born 1997), South African cricketer
Bailey Andison (born 1997), Canadian competitive swimmer
Bailey Boswell, one of Sydney Loofe’s killers
Bailey Bram (born 1990), Canadian retired ice hockey player
Bailey Bryan, American singer-songwriter
Bailey De Young (born 1989), American actress and dancer
Bailey Doogan (1941-2022), American artist
Bailey Hanks (born 1988), American singer, actress, and dancer
Bailey Hemphill (born 1998), American former softball player
Bailey Hunt (born 1996), Australian rules footballer
Bailey Jay (born 1988), American actress, model, presenter, and podcaster
Bailey Landry (born 1995), American softball player
Bailey Mes (born 1989), Auckland-born New Zealand netball player
Bailey Noble (born 1990), American actress
Bailey Ryon (born 2002), American child actress
Bailey Sarian (born 1988), American YouTuber, podcaster
Bailey Tzuke (born 1987), English singer-songwriter
Bailey Webster (born 1991), American volleyball player
Bailey White (born 1950), American author and National Public Radio commentator

Fictional characters
Bailey Quarters, on the American television series WKRP in Cincinnati
Bailey, a beluga whale and a character in the 2016 Disney/Pixar animated film Finding Dory
Bailey Salinger, on the American television series Party of Five
Bailey Turner, on the Australian soap opera Neighbours

References

English unisex given names
English-language unisex given names
Masculine given names
Feminine given names
Unisex given names